Rubovietnamia is a genus of plants in the family Rubiaceae, native to Vietnam and southern China.

At the present time (May 2014), two species are known:

Rubovietnamia aristata Tirveng. - Yunnan, Guangxi, Vietnam
Rubovietnamia nonggangensis F.J.Mou & D.X.Zhang - Guangxi
Rubovietnamia coronula  Ulrich Meve  - Philippines

References

External links
photo of herbarium specimen at Missouri Botanical Garden, collected in Vietnam, Rubovietnamia aristata

Rubiaceae genera
Gardenieae